George Milton Ziegler (1832–1912) was a Union Army officer from Ohio during the American Civil War. He was commissioned a second lieutenant in the 47th Ohio Infantry Regiment on August 28, 1861. He was promoted to first lieutenant on December 6, 1861 and to captain on December 28, 1862. On December 22, 1864 he was named colonel of the 52nd United States Colored Infantry Regiment. 

On March 24, 1866, President Andrew Johnson nominated Ziegler for appointment to the grade of brevet brigadier general of volunteers, to rank from March 13, 1865, and the United States Senate confirmed the appointment on April 10, 1866.

He is interred at Green Lawn Cemetery in Columbus, Ohio.

See also

 List of American Civil War brevet generals (Union)

References

Bibliography

External links
 

1832 births
1912 deaths
Union Army colonels
United States Army officers
People of Ohio in the American Civil War
Burials at Green Lawn Cemetery (Columbus, Ohio)